Ardoch Township is a township in Walsh County, North Dakota, United States. 50.5% (47) of the population are male, and the other 49.5% (46) are female.

References

See also
Walsh County, North Dakota

Townships in North Dakota
Townships in Walsh County, North Dakota